Le Conte, LeConte, or Leconte may refer to:

People
 Cincinnatus Leconte (1853–1912), president of Haiti 1911-1912
 Emmanuel Leconte (born 1982), French actor
 Henri Leconte (born 1963), French tennis player
 John Le Conte (1818–1891), scientist and first president of UC Berkeley
 John Eatton Le Conte (1784–1860), naturalist
 John Lawrence LeConte (1825–1883), entomologist
 Joseph LeConte (1823–1901), geologist and professor at University of South Carolina, UC Berkeley, and founding member of the Sierra Club
 Joseph Nisbet LeConte (1870–1950), explorer and engineering professor at UC Berkeley, Sierra Club leader
 Joska Le Conté (born 1987), Dutch skeleton racer
 Maria Leconte (born 1970), French chess grandmaster
 Patrice Leconte (born 1947), French film director
 Pierre-Michel Le Conte (1921–2000), French conductor
 Valleran le Conte (fl. 1590 – c. 1615), French actor-manager
 Leconte de Lisle (1818–1894), French poet
 LeConte Stewart (1891–1990), artist and professor at the University of Utah

Places
 LeConte Bay, in Alaska
 LeConte Falls, in Yosemite National Park, California
 LeConte Glacier
 LeConte Hall in Berkeley, California
 Leconte Island in Nunavut, Canada
 LeConte Memorial Lodge, in Yosemite Valley
 Le Conte Middle School, in Los Angeles
 Mount Le Conte (California)
 Mount Le Conte (Tennessee)

Other uses
 Le Conte du Graal or Perceval, the Story of the Grail
 Le Conte du ventre plein, English title Bellyfull, 2000 film
 Le Conte pear
 Leconte Prize, prize in mathematics and science awarded by French Academy of Sciences
 Le Conte Station, light rail station in San Francisco
 Leconte's haploa, Haploa lecontei, a moth of the subfamily Arctiinae
 Le Conte's thrasher, Toxostoma lecontei
 Le Conte's sparrow, Ammodramus leconteii
 M/V LeConte, a vessel in the Alaska Marine Highway System